P. dubia may refer to:
 Partulina dubia, a gastropod species endemic to the United States
 Phelsuma dubia, the dull day gecko, a diurnal lizard species
 Praya dubia, the giant siphonophore, a deep sea organism
 Psychotria dubia, a plant species endemic to Sri Lanka

Synonyms
 Petrophile dubia, a synonym for Isopogon dubius, a small shrub
 Prosopis dubia, a synonym for Enterolobium cyclocarpum, the guanacaste, caro caro or elephant ear tree, a legume species

See also
 Dubia (disambiguation)